Tim Floyd is a Gaelic games administrator who is current secretary of the Tipperary County Board. In this capacity he delivers a report to the county convention.

Floyd is with the Newport club.

In April 2014, Floyd said he was fault for the county board being fined €500 after he failed to inform the Irish Sports Council that Tipperary hurlers would not be training at Dr Morris Park on one night they had been scheduled to train in March 2013.

In 2015, Floyd said that Hawk-Eye would not be deployed at Semple Stadium that year. In March 2016, he announced the technology would be introduced.

In September 2017, Floyd and Tipperary opposed a mooted round-robin restructuring of the All-Ireland Senior Hurling Championship, citing the sidelining of club hurling.

In a December 2017 report to the county's annual convention, Floyd wrote that Jason Forde's part in an incident with Davy Fitzgerald during the 2017 National Hurling League, and for which Forde received a one-game ban, was "trivial" and that the hurler was found "guilty by association". Floyd's contention that a "melee" (to which Forde was accused of contributing) was not defined in the Gaelic Athletic Association's rulebook led to a motion on the issue being put to the following year's GAA Congress, with one writer in The Irish Times comparing it to the then upcoming Repeal the Eighth Amendment on abortion as another "major issue [to be] voted on in 2018".

References

Year of birth missing (living people)
Living people
Tipperary County Board administrators